Debeli Namet is a small glacier below Mount Šljeme in the Durmitor massif, Montenegro.

Geography 
This glacier exists well below the true snowline and is sustained by avalanching snow. Results of recent investigations on the Debeli Namet glacier have been published by a British scientist (Hughes 2007). The Debeli Namet glacier is not quite the southernmost glacier in Europe, as this status currently goes to the Snezhnika glacier (latitude of 41°46′09″ N) followed by Banski Suhodol Glacier also in Pirin mountain in Bulgaria and the Calderone Glacier in Italy.

References

Glaciers of Montenegro